East Thurrock United Football Club is a football club based in Corringham, Essex, England.

History
The club was founded on 27 April 1969 by a group of fans who felt that the area around Corringham and Stanford-le-Hope should have a senior non-league football club, following the successful Corringham Social Sunday league team. The new club played in the Southern Essex Combination for the 1969–70 season and finished third in the league, before joining the reserve section of the Greater London League in 1970. They went on to win the division at the first attempt. The league merged with the Metropolitan League at the end of the season to form the Metropolitan–London League, with East Thurrock remaining in the reserve division. After winning the division in 1971–72, they moved up to the senior divisions, joining Division Two. They also won this division at the first attempt and were promoted to Division One.

After the league merged with the Spartan League to form the London Spartan League in 1975, East Thurrock were placed in Division Two. They remained in Division Two until restructuring saw them moved into the Premier Division in 1978. In 1979 the club switched to the Essex Senior League. In 1988–89 they won the League Cup, a feat they repeated in 1991–92, a season that also saw them finish third in the league, earning promotion to Division Three of the Isthmian League. In 1999–2000 they were Division Three champions, earning promotion to Division Two. Two seasons later they were placed in Division One North upon league reorganisation, before being moved into the Eastern Division of the Southern League for the 2004–05 season as part of wider restructuring of the non-League pyramid. After finishing as Eastern Division runners-up in the first season, they were promoted and moved back to the Isthmian League, joining its Premier Division.

East Thurrock were relegated back to Division One North of the Isthmian League at the end of the 2007–08 season following a one-point deduction for fielding an ineligible player. They finished as runners-up in 2008–09, qualifying for the promotion play-offs, but lost 1–0 to Concord Rangers in the semi-finals. A fifth-place finish the 2009–10 saw the club qualify for the play-offs again, but they were again beaten 1–0 by Concord Rangers in the semi-finals. In 2010–11 the club won the division and were promoted to the Premier Division. In 2011–12 they reached the first round of the FA Cup for the first time in their history, losing 3–0 at home to Macclesfield Town. The following season saw them finish fifth in the Isthmian League Premier Division, qualifying for the play-offs. However, they lost 1–0 to Lowestoft Town in the semi-finals.

In 2014–15 East Thurrock reached the first round of the FA Cup again, this time losing 2–0 at Hartlepool United. In the following season they finished third in the Premier Division, again qualifying for the play-offs. The club beat Tonbridge Angels 2–0 in the semi-finals and Dulwich Hamlet 3–1 in the final in front of a record crowd of 1,661, resulting in promotion to the National League South. After three seasons in the sixth tier, the club finished second-from-bottom of the National League South in 2018–19, and were relegated back to the Isthmian League's Premier Division in a season that also saw them win the Essex Senior Cup for the first time in their history, defeating Chelmsford City 3–1 in the final.

Ground
During the club's first season as members of the Southern Essex Combination, in 1969–70, home matches were played at Corringham Recreation Ground. They subsequently moved to the Billet Ground in Stanford-Le-Hope, before ground-sharing with nearby Grays Athletic during the 1973–74 season in order to be granted senior status by the Essex County Football Association, before returning to the Billet Ground after upgrading works had taken place.

In 1977 the club left the Billet Ground again, groundsharing at Tilbury until 1982, when they moved to the Thames Board Mill Ground. They remained at the new ground for two years. Still seeking their own ground, the club bought land on the edge of Corringham Marshes and began building the Rookery Ground, which opened in 1984. The site had previously been the home ground of Lathol Athletic. Temporary seating was installed in 1989 prior to an FA Vase fifth round match against Bashley.

A 160-seat main stand was erected, with a covered terrace built on the other side of the pitch, together with two covered areas behind one goal. The ground currently has a capacity of 3,000, of which 160 is seated and 1,000 covered.

Coaching staff
Manager:  Marc Harrison
Assistant Manager: Liam Wallace
First Team Coaches: Chris Tapp, Drew Kilner and Dan Tolley

Honours
Isthmian League
Division One North champions 2010–11
Division Three champions 1999–2000
Essex Senior Cup
Winners 2018–19
Metropolitan–London League
Division Two champions 1972–73
Reserve Division champions 1971–72
Greater London League
Reserve Division champions 1970–71
Essex Senior League
League Cup winners 1988–89, 1991–92
East Anglian Cup
Winners 2002–03

Records
Best FA Cup performance: First round, 2011–12, 2014–15
Best FA Trophy performance: Third round, 2017–18
Best FA Vase performance: Fifth round, 1988–89
Record attendance: 1,661 vs Dulwich Hamlet, Isthmian League Premier Division play-off final, 2016
Biggest win: 7–0 vs Coggeshall Town, Essex Senior League, 1984
Heaviest defeat: 9–0 vs Eton Manor, Essex Senior League, 1982
Most appearances: Glen Case, over 600
Most goals: Sam Higgins, 275
Record transfer fee received: £20,000 from Leyton Orient for Greg Berry, 1990

See also
East Thurrock United F.C. players

References

External links
Official website

Football clubs in England
Football clubs in Essex
Association football clubs established in 1969
1969 establishments in England
Sport in Thurrock
Greater London League
Metropolitan–London League
Spartan League
Essex Senior Football League
Isthmian League
Southern Football League clubs
National League (English football) clubs